Swati Bhise (née Gupte; born 21 October 1959) is a Bharatanatyam dancer, choreographer, educator, producer, director, writer and promoter of the arts.

Dance career
Swati is the first disciple of "Padma Vibhushan" Sonal Mansingh.  Since her debut performance at the Center of Indian Classical Dances in New Delhi, she has performed extensively around the world at venues including the National Centre for the Performing Arts (India), Lincoln Center, Asia Society, Symphony Space, Metropolitan Museum of Art, SPIC MACAY, and the House of Soviet Culture, among others. Some of her more notable performances have been for the 40th anniversary of the United Nations General assembly, the unveiling of Elsa Peretti and Paloma Picasso's new mesh designs for Tiffany & Co, and The Metropolitan Museum of Art for the opening of the South Asian Sculpture Wing. Swati also worked on the Indian choreography for Thomas Mann’s The Transposed Heads, adapted by Sidney Goldfarb and Julie Taymor.  Swati was featured in a CBS documentary called 'Sacred Arts', as one of the foremost performers in her field.

Educator
Swati served as an artist in residence at the Brearley School, New York City from 1991 to 2006 and founded the non-profit Sanskriti Center for Indian arts in education for children and adolescents. She continues to teach for The Curriculum in Arts Program at Symphony Space and has been a Lincoln Center Institute repertory artist since 1996. She has also performed at hundreds of public and private schools, colleges, and universities across The United States including Columbia University, New York University, University of Texas at Austin, St. Mark's School of Texas, The Dalton School, The Brearley School, The Chapin School, Brooklyn College, and Wesleyan University.

Theater and film production 
In 2012, Swati founded The Sadir Theater Festival, a three- day festival that takes place annually in Goa, India. Critically acclaimed theater stars including Lilette Dubey, Girish Karnad, Rajat Kapoor, Mohammad Ali Baig, and Vikram Kapadia have all participated over the years, and she is still the festival's artistic director. Swati also brought the UNESCO heritage art form Kunqu opera, one of the oldest styles of Chinese theatre, to India for the first time with performances at The National Centre for the Performing Arts, Mumbai, and at Siri Fort Auditorium in New Delhi. In 2014, Swati founded a film production company called Cayenne Pepper Productions after serving as Executive Producer and Indian cultural consultant on The Man Who Knew Infinity (film), an Edward R Pressman film starring Dev Patel and Jeremy Irons. The film premiered at the Toronto International Film Festival in September 2015.

Swati recently finished directing a British / Indian self-written period drama set in 19th century India. The film The Warrior Queen of Jhansi released in theatres in November 2019 in the US, Canada and India.'' The film was the first Hollywood action film in history with a brown female lead and received the “Impact Award” at the Vancouver International Women in Film Festival and the prestigious The ReFrame Stamp for demonstrating gender parity Her daughter Devika Bhise played the titular role.

Swati has sat on numerous panels including the five-member grand jury at the 9th annual Mahindra Excellence in Theatre Awards (META) alongside Shabana Azmi, Sushma Seth, Kulbhushan Kharbanda, and Utkarsh Mazumdar. She is also the co-author of the book Aai's Recipes: Traditional Indian cuisine from Maharashtra, a collection of Chandraseniya Kayasthan Prabhu (CKP) recipes, along with her mother Usha Gupte.'

Personal life
Swati currently lives in New York and Goa with her husband, entrepreneur and philanthropist, Bharat Bhisé, her mother, and their four dogs. (Two Dobermans & Two Boxers)

Choreographies
 Kama Sutra: A Dance-Dialog for Rye Arts Center / Indo-American Council
 Shristi for [Lincoln Center Institute]
 Mass for the Dead for The American Chamber Opera Company and Alice Shields
 Rasa in Theory and Practice for The American Museum of Natural History
 Emotions in Indian Dance 
Ashtanayika: 8 broad facets of a woman 
 Metropolitan Museum of Art - Uris Auditorium - 'Sringara'
 Brooklyn Museum - Realms of heroism - 'Ashtānayika in Indian miniature paintings'
 Smithsonian - Arthur Sackler Wing "Role of Sakhi in the Gita Govinda" Curated by Dr. Vidya Dehejia
 Nayikas - for the unveiling of Elsa Peretti and Paloma Picasso's mesh designs for Tiffany & Co.
 Jazz Carnatic Ragamalika Dashavatara for Jazz at Lincoln Center
 Jazz Carnatic Ragamalika Navarasa for Jazz at Lincoln Center
 Jazz Carnatic Hindolam Tillana for Jazz at Lincoln Center
 Conductor and Choreographer for the carnatic music and orchestra arrangement for the dance segments by 17-year old twins, Riya and Sara Kapoor, at the Newport Jazz Festival in 2017

Philanthropy
Swati is an outspoken advocate for women's empowerment with a focus on South East Asia. She is a Lotus Circle advisor for The Asia Foundation, a "nonprofit international development organization committed to improving lives across a dynamic and developing Asia".

Inspired from her film The Warrior Queen of Jhansi, in November 2021, Swati Bhise launched "The Warrior Queen Project," a nonprofit foundation geared to empower Asian American Pacific Islander (AAPI) Women to become warrior queens. The project is projected to launch in early 2022.

References

1959 births
Living people
Bharatanatyam exponents
Indian female classical dancers
Dancers from Maharashtra
20th-century Indian dancers
Women artists from Maharashtra
20th-century Indian women artists